In algebraic geometry, a cone is a generalization of a vector bundle. Specifically, given a scheme X, the relative Spec

of a quasi-coherent graded OX-algebra R is called the cone or affine cone of R. Similarly, the relative Proj

is called the projective cone of C or R.

Note: The cone comes with the -action due to the grading of R; this action is a part of the data of a cone (whence the terminology).

Examples 
If X = Spec k is a point and R is a homogeneous coordinate ring, then the affine cone of R is the (usual) affine cone over the projective variety corresponding to R.
If  for some ideal sheaf I, then  is the normal cone to the closed scheme determined by I.
If  for some line bundle L, then  is the total space of the dual of L.
Let  be a coherent sheaf on a Deligne–Mumford stack X. Then let  For any , since global Spec is a right adjoint to the direct image functor, we have: ; in particular,  is a commutative group scheme over X.
Then there is a closed immersion

Because of this,  is called the abelian hull of the cone  For example, if  for some ideal sheaf I, then this embedding is the embedding of the normal cone into the normal bundle.

Computations 
Consider the complete intersection ideal  and let  be the projective scheme defined by the ideal sheaf . Then, we have the isomorphism of -algebras is given by

Properties 
If  is a graded homomorphism of graded OX-algebras, then one gets an induced morphism between the cones:
.
If the homomorphism is surjective, then one gets closed immersions 

In particular, assuming R0 = OX, the construction applies to the projection  (which is an augmentation map) and gives
.
It is a section; i.e.,  is the identity and is called the zero-section embedding.

Consider the graded algebra R[t] with variable t having degree one: explicitly, the n-th degree piece is
.
The projective cone  is called the projective completion of CR. Indeed, the zero-locus t = 0 is exactly  and the complement is the open subscheme CR. The locus t = 0 is called the hyperplane at infinity.

O(1) 
Let R be a quasi-coherent graded OX-algebra such that R0 = OX and R is locally generated as OX-algebra by R1. Then, by definition, the projective cone of R is:

where the colimit runs over open affine subsets U of X. By assumption R(U) has finitely many degree-one generators xi's. Thus,

For any integer n, one also writes O(n) for the n-th tensor power of O(1). If the cone C=SpecXR is the total space of a vector bundle E, then O(-1) is the tautological line bundle on the projective bundle P(E).

Remark: When the (local) generators of R have degree other than one, the construction of O(1) still goes through but with a weighted projective space in place of a projective space; so the resulting O(1) is not necessarily a line bundle. In the language of divisor, this O(1) corresponds to a Q-Cartier divisor.

Notes

References

Lecture Notes

Reference 

  
§ 8 of 

Algebraic geometry